Zarechny is a rural locality (a settlement) in Mstyora Urban Settlement, Vyaznikovsky District, Vladimir Oblast, Russia. The population was 321 as of 2010.

Geography 
Zarechny is located on the Tara River, 22 km northwest of Vyazniki (the district's administrative centre) by road. Slobodka is the nearest rural locality.

References 

Rural localities in Vyaznikovsky District